Loreto Secondary School, Kilkenny is a Roman Catholic voluntary secondary school for girls in Kilkenny, Ireland.  It was founded by the Sisters of Loreto in 1868.  The school provides post primary education for girls, while preparing them the Junior and Leaving Certificate examinations.  The school provides a comprehensive Transition Year programme and offers the Leaving Certificate Applied Programme also.   Loreto is located on the north east of the city of Kilkenny with access from both the Granges and Freshford roads.  Since its foundation, the school has maintained a tradition of providing teaching and learning to the highest standards while emphasising the importance of promoting the personal development of each student through the provision of a broad range of extra-curricular activities and pastoral supports.

Curriculum 
Loreto Secondary School offers a wide range of subjects. A highly flexible, student-centred curriculum is offered with maximum options so that each student can tailor her own curriculum to best suit her needs, interests and talents.  Over the past five years the school has greatly expanded its curriculum through the introduction of new subjects.  

Since September 2020, all lessons are of one hour’s duration. After an extensive review process that included consultation with students and parents, it has been decided to continue with this structure. The following have been identified as key strengths of this approach:

Better depth to the teaching and learning experience in the classroom
Improved scope to support student learning in new topics
Easier to use a wide variety of teaching methodologies
Less time lost during the day do to transitions between classes
Less stress for students – easier to plan for a day with six lessons
Less complex timetables – easier for new students to navigate and manage lockers etc.

Junior Curriculum
Loreto's Junior Cycle curriculum is innovative and embraces forward-thinking educational philosophies. The curriculum gives maximum scope to each student to tailor her own programme to meet her needs in terms of her interests and talents. This is achieved by giving our students maximum choice when it comes to selecting their subject options for 2nd Year. There is an appropriate emphasis on well-being, with students assigned almost 400 hours of tuition in this area over the course of their Junior Cycle programme.

In First Year, all students study the full range of subjects on offer for the duration of the year. Therefore, no choices have to be made prior to enrolment. This allows students to make an informed decision with regard to their options for Junior Cycle.

Loreto's classes are formed on the basis of mixed ability. This approach benefits all students in each class and contributes to Loreto’s extraordinary academic achievements. Higher and Ordinary level classes are formed in Irish (at the start of Second Year) and Mathematics (during First Year). English is streamed from the start of Fifth Year.

In addition to continuing the study of the core examination subjects of English, Irish (except for students who are exempt), Mathematics and History, students choose five of the following subjects (free choice) to continue with into 2nd Year.

Art, Business Studies, French, Geography, German, Home Economics, Music, Science, Graphics.

In addition, students take the following non-examination subjects which are a vital part of the programme:

Religious Education, Choir (optional after First Year), Civic Social and Political Education (C.S.P.E.), Physical Education (P.E.), Social Personal and Health Education (including Relationships and Sexuality Education), Artistic Performance and Digital Media Literacy (First Year).

Option subjects are chosen in the Spring of First Year. Due to Loreto's student-centred approach and efficient use of the best available technologies, generally 100% of its students will get their top preferences (100% in 2021 and 2022 for example).

Transition Year
Transition Year (TY) is an optional year at Loreto, taken by roughly 90% of its students. The programme bridges the gap between the Junior Cycle and the Leaving Certificate programmes. TY encourages personal, social and academic development and actively promotes independent learning and thinking. The programme offers taster modules of the subjects on offer at Leaving Certificate level which allows a more informed subject choice. TY encourages the development of a wide range of transferable critical thinking and creative problem-solving skills which prepares students for the Leaving Certificate, further study and the world of work. Students are permitted to participate in two separate weeks of work experience.

Students in TY follow a full programme of the academic subjects on offer at senior cycle, along with Religious Education, PE, Careers, IT, Social Education, SPHE and RSE. In addition, students currently choose one of the following modules: Junk Kouture, Mini-company, Computer Science, Drama & Effective Communications.

Choir is offered as an option and there are also modules in Spanish, Chinese and Road Safety for those who do not choose Choir. 

Further to the timetabled curriculum, workshops are organised in many areas, such as First Aid, Creative Thinking and Problem-solving, SOAR Resilience training, among many others.

An outdoor pursuits trip to Carlingford is undertaken annually.

Many students participate in the Gaisce and the Aim High Award programmes and also in the ORC Confirmation retreat programmes in the local community. Volunteering is strongly encouraged during TY, in line with the Loreto ethos.

Students are free to enter numerous competitions, such as The Young Scientist competition, Young Economist of the Year and Junk Kouture.

Leaving Certificate
Loreto offers a broad range of subjects in the Leaving Certificate (5th and 6th Year). All students take the core examination subjects of Irish (except for students who have an exemption), English and Mathematics as well as Religious Education, Guidance and Physical Education for the duration of the programme. Students can also choose to study Choir or I.T. All students continue with R.S.E. (Relationships and Sexuality Education) in 5th and 6th Year.

In the year prior to entry to senior cycle, students are given a completely free choice of any four of the above subjects. On average, 98% of students receive their top four preferences.  Students are also offered the Leaving Certificate Vocational Programme as one of their option subjects (see below).

Leaving Certificate Vocational Programme
This course, which is available each year to students, offers an enhanced Leaving Certificate in the form of the Leaving Certificate Vocational Programme (L.C.V.P.). The L.C.V.P. student undertakes the study of two Link Modules: “Enterprise Education” and “Preparation for the World of Work” in addition to the normal programme of core and optional Leaving Certificate subjects (above). The programme increases the number of C.A.O. points secured by many of those that take the course and is offered as one of their four option subjects.

Leaving Certificate Applied
The Leaving Certificate Applied (LCA) programme, which is a distinct, self-contained two-year programme aimed at preparing students for adult and working life, is offered to all students. The programme puts an emphasis on forms of achievement and excellence that the established Leaving Certificate has not recognised in the past. Over the years, Loreto's classes have done very well. The numbers achieving the highest grade (distinction) well exceed the national average.

Management
The management of Loreto has been delegated to a Board of Management which is appointed by the Loreto Education Trust for a three-year term of office. The Board of Management comprises four members nominated by the Trustees themselves, two parents of current students and two members of the teaching staff. The Board manages the school in accordance with the educational vision of the Loreto Education Trust and the Articles of Management for Voluntary Secondary Schools

The Board normally meets each month of the school year and issues a report on each of its meetings.

The Principal, Colm Keher, is the secretary of the board and attends all meetings without voting rights.

A report of each meeting is published to the school community of parents, students and staff through the Compass system (administration portal).  

The voice of Loreto's students is represented through a Student Council. Its officers meet with the Parents’ Association and the Board of Management from time to time.

The Board of Management appoints an in-school leadership and management team which is responsible for:
 Managing the school on a day-to-day basis 
 Implementing school policy to ensure high quality teaching, learning and student care
 Providing visionary leadership to shape the future of Loreto, ensuring that our school continues to meet the needs of our students, parents and wider community.
 Maintaining and upholding the Loreto ethos and the educational philosophy of Mary Ward.

Digital Learning
Loreto is committed to providing an educational experience in tune with the technological developments of our time. Loreto's aim is that all students leave school comfortable working and learning in a computer-based environment.

In recent years Loreto has expanded its I.T. infrastructure to support this philosophy. There are three computer rooms and each classroom is equipped with a data projector while each teacher has a laptop/tablet device for use in class. There is a secure WiFi network throughout the school, promoting active learning and research. Since 2012 Junior students have been using tablet devices to access their text books. Each student uses an Apple iPad in class to enhance her learning experience. The tablet device opens up an array of learning opportunities including safe internet research and a huge range of apps.

Each student also has her own ‘portal’ on Loreto's administration app (Compass). Through her portal, she can monitor her own academic progress and attendance record while receiving communications about school events. Furthermore, teachers can assign work through the portal and track progress accordingly. Parents also have access to their own portal on Compass through which they can monitor their daughter’s progress also.

The use of digital technologies is an integral part of our curriculum in all subject areas. 4th, 5th and 6th Years are timetabled for computer classes to prepare for internationally recognised qualifications. Loreto also has introduced a course in computer programming, while our computer club, ‘Tech Team’, appeals to those with a special interest in computing.
Loreto has introduced the new Leaving Certificate subject, Computer Science, and the first class will present for the Leaving Certificate examination in 2023.

In 2018, Loreto introduced a new ‘short course’ for first year students entitled Digital Media Literacy. This course provides students with the knowledge and skills required to get the best out of technology while staying safe online and being respectful of others in the world of social media.

Academic Achievements
In keeping with the Loreto Educational Philosophy, Loreto ‘promotes excellence appropriate to each student’. A culture of high expectations is identified by all international research as a key component of successful schools. Loreto's academic achievements in the State Examinations provide further proof that this is the case. At Loreto, a culture of learning prevails in each class to the benefit of all students of all abilities. Each year, in the State Examinations, Loreto's results far surpass national averages in terms of the numbers of students taking examinations at Higher Level and the achievement of high grades in all subjects in all levels.

Our 2022 Leaving Certificate results maintained Loreto's consistently high standards. Loreto's students, in all ranges of ability, over perform significantly in the Leaving Certificate examinations relative to national averages with exceptional progression rates to third level.
Loreto's progression rates to third level are consistently among the very best in the country. 84% of the class of 2022 enrolled in one of the main Universities (including the technical universities), with 83% of the class commencing a degree-level course. 71% of Loreto's graduates progressed to study in one of the seven Universities (excluding the technical universities) or teacher training colleges (according to the Irish Independent Loreto has been the top school in Kilkenny in that regard for three years in a row). This reflects a consistently high performance, and Loreto has been one of the top ten schools in Leinster for the past thirteen years (source Sunday Times). This is a remarkable achievement for a school with a non-selective enrolment policy.

While Loreto's results surpass national averages, its enrolment of students reflects the national averages in terms of ability. The Loreto culture of high expectations is a rising tide that lifts all boats. Loreto's aim is always to help, support, guide and inspire each girl to reach her potential. Recent initiatives such as student target grades and our progress support team support these aims.

We also have an excellent learning support department that has strong structures in place to support the learning of those who have specific challenges to overcome.

Extra-Curricular

Student Leadership 
Loreto values the benefits gained for its students by giving them positions of responsibility. There are many extra-curricular activities and programmes providing opportunities such as: Head Girls, Games Captains, Senior Prefects, Class Prefects, Library Prefects, Student Council, Green Schools Committee, Peer Mentoring Programme. Furthermore, Loreto affirms student achievement with a number of awards schemes. The latest addition in this regard is a scheme which acknowledges the academic improvement of students in our house examinations.

Music 
Music is an integral part of the life of Loreto. All 1st Year students take part in choir and it is an option in all other years. More than 500 girls sing in school choirs and the annual highlight of the year is the school's participation in the Kilkenny Music Festival. The girls regularly perform in school concerts, liturgies and other school events. In recent years, the 6th Year choir competed in the Bratislava Advent Festival, winning a Gold award. The famous Loreto orchestra, with over 100 members, rehearses every Thursday after school, giving students the opportunity to develop as ensemble players. The orchestra competes annually in the All Ireland Feis Ceoil and Loreto has claimed the famed Dorothy Meyer Cup on numerous occasions. This is the premier orchestra competition for second-level school orchestras in Ireland.

Sport 
Loreto values the role that sport plays in the personal development of its students. Loreto offers a wide range of sports and is proud of the level of participation and success. The school has an Olympic standard gymnasium/basketball arena, an all-weather, astro-turf floodlit Hockey pitch as well as a Camogie/Gaelic football pitch. During the summer of 2018, the Hockey pitch was upgraded to the most up-to-date surface available and is now capable of hosting international matches. Loreto also has a high performance Gym equipment which our senior students can avail of outside of class time. Training for games takes place during lunch hour and after school.

Athletics 
The Athletics team has experienced unprecedented successes over the years. Many of Lorto's athletes have achieved opportunities to compete at Provincial, National and International level. Two national records are currently held by past pupils with Loreto Kilkenny one of the top girls’ schools in the All Ireland schools competition. Loreto Kilkenny is the current holder of the famous Loreto Shield for the best overall Loreto athletics team in Ireland. This is an annual competition which was first introduced in 1905 making it one of the oldest competitions for women in the world.

Running Club/Cross Country 
The Running Club is a lunch-time club that encourages all students to get fit. All students from 1st to 6th year are welcome to join up. The students also have the option of taking part in cross country competitions during the year. Loreto athletes have an amazing record in the All Ireland Cross Country championships, regularly placing in the medals as individuals or in the team events.

Hockey 
Loreto competes in the South-East League at Senior, Junior and Minor level. The school has produced many fine hockey players over the years that have participated in Inter-Pro competitions, Inter-varsity competitions, U-21 Internationals and full Senior Internationals. The school has won many league and cup finals over the years and is very proud of its long tradition in this sport.

Basketball 
We have many Basketball teams in the school and we participate in the south-east league every year. Loreto has been competing at 'A' standard for the past few years and reached the Senior All Ireland final in 2022.

Badminton 
Loreto's Badminton teams have competed very well at the local, provincial and national championships over the past few years winning a Senior Div 2 title two years ago and last year winning the U-14 Div 2 title for the first time.

Swimming 
Loreto enters a swim team into the Loreto Gala every year and last year Kilkenny won best overall Loreto School at this competition in the NAC. We have also won the Best School Spirit award at this competition.

Equestrian 
Many of Loreto's students compete in schools’ equestrian competitions during the year. The school supports and encourages any students who are involved in these competitions.

Soccer 
All First Year students compete in the Loreto Champions League in early September. The First Year Panel also competes in the National Futsal Cup of which Loreto were National champions in 2009. Soccer is provided at U-14, U-15, U-17 and U-19 levels and Loreto has been Leinster “A” Champions in all age groups in recent years. Loreto’s under 17 soccer team won back to back U-17 Junior All-Ireland Championships in 2013 & 2014.

Camogie 
Loreto enters teams in all age groups: First Year, Minor, Junior and Senior. The school’s achievements over the past decade have been incredible to say the least. Loreto is currently at the top of the Senior and Junior 'A' All Ireland rolls of honour and can consider itself the most successful school of all time in Ireland in Camogie.

Gaelic Football 
Loreto has been entering teams in Leinster competitions for a long number of years and there is a growing interest in sport in the school.

Golf 
Loreto has a growing interest and success in the game of Golf. Its teams have won Leinster titles and have competed at All Ireland level.

Other Extra-curricular Activities 
Students can avail of a wide range of extra- and co-curricular activities, including:

Green Schools Committee – Loreto was awarded its first Green Flag in 2009 and has a very active committee.

Debating
Teams are entered into Loreto and other debating competitions.  Loreto Kilkenny's senior debaters won the All Ireland Loreto Schools senior Mace debating cup in 2022. 

Public Access to Law – Loreto competed in the world ‘mock trial’ competition for the fourth time in New York 2019.

Other activities

Justice and Peace/development education – this activity involves the exploration of justice issues.

St. Vincent De Paul – Loreto has a very active society - 'The Mary Ward Chapter'.

School quiz competitions

Gaisce – Presidents’ Award

School Tours - Loreto's most recent foreign trips included Paris 2023, Barcelona 2023, London 2022.

Tech Team – for students with a particular interest in computing

Loreto also runs a large number of lunchtime clubs including: fun and games club, movie club, reading club, animation club, arts and crafts club etc.

History
The story of the founding of the Loreto convent and school in Kilkenny is an interesting one with many aspects not widely known.  To tell this story it is necessary to start at the beginning with the founding of the Institute of the Blessed Virgin Mary (formal name of the Loreto Order), by an English woman, Mary Ward, in 1609.  She pioneered a new model of self-governance by female religious and, inspired by St. Ignatius, she wished for the freedom of her order to work outside the walls of the convent with the poor and to open schools for girls.  Her order met with early success and spread through Europe but unfortunately her radical approach did not meet with universal favour and her life’s work ended with the apparent failure of the closure of her houses and the suppression of her order.  Mary Ward ended her days in York with a small group of followers.  Approximately forty years later, a convent (known as the Bar Convent) was founded in York by a group of nuns who were inspired by the charism of Mary Ward.

Nearly two centuries later, a young Dublin girl, Frances Teresa Ball, was sent to York to receive her education. She would later enter the novitiate of the I.B.V.M. and in 1821 she returned to Dublin to found the Irish branch of the Order which would be known as ‘Loreto’; named after the Italian town which holds the relic of the house of the Holy Family.

The Irish branch of the I.B.V.M. was destined to thrive and over the next century established schools across the globe.  Frances Teresa Ball had a strong desire to found a school in Ossory and particularly in the seat of the diocese. The annals record that in 1858, she attempted to buy a house in Kilkenny, but with no success.  They then founded a school and convent in Borris-in-Ossory having been invited by the local parish priest of the time, Father John Birch. Mother Teresa Ball did not give up her dream of founding a school in Kilkenny however and in 1860 the Loreto sisters had moved into a house in 30 Patrick’s Street.  This building was on the site of the existing Hibernian Hotel (built in 1905 and formerly the Hibernian Bank). We are told the ground floor was occupied by a Solicitor’s office. The schools were opened in October and were well attended, notwithstanding this, however, the nuns only remained a few months here, ‘the neighbours being too noisy and unsuitable and the premises were finally given up in March, 1861’. No doubt things are very different in Patrick’s Street now!

Meanwhile the school in Borris-in-Ossory had not grown significantly with only 120 or so students.  It is recorded that Rev. Mother Scholastica Somers, Frances Teresa Ball’s successor, had ‘then [in 1868] decided that a wider field of labour was more in accordance with the spirit of the Order and the aims of its foundress.’  Accordingly, Rev. Mother Ball’s original idea of establishing a convent in Kilkenny city was revived, and ‘recognised as a more progressive plan’. Therefore the Loreto Sisters withdrew from Borris, and set up their new home in Kilkenny City.  In 1868, Rev. Mother Scholastica Somers had purchased a house in Kilkenny that had previously been the town residence of Lord Clifden. This building, between St. Canice’s Cathedral and the current site of the school, is now the home of the Good Shepherd Centre.  Even though it is not well-known locally, this building had previously been used by St. Kieran’s College in its early years, providing an interesting shared history between the two famous schools. The annals record that the nuns first arrived on the 9th of September, bringing with them two students from Borris-in-Ossory which was being closed at that time. The first Mass in the Convent was celebrated on the 13th by a Rev. T. Kelly, later Dean of the Diocese. M.M. Patricia Hughes was the first Mother Superior, having also transferred from Borris-in-Ossory. The school opened its doors to students on the 5th of October 1868.  

According to an advertisement placed in the Freeman’s Journal at the time, the curriculum on offer was: English, German, Italian, French, Plain and Fancy Work, Arithmetic. The extra curricular activities were: Music (vocal and instrumental), Dancing, Flower Arranging, Drawing and Painting. The school, boarding and day, thrived on that site, with many expansions and alterations over the years. In the 1970s the decision was made to build a new school on the Granges Road. This new school was opened in 1980 and the boarding school was closed in 1984. Since the school’s arrival at the Granges road, many changes have also taken place with dramatic enhancements to the facilities over the years.

In the early days, dressing rooms for P.E. and games were added on at a time when the Gym was in the current canteen area.  These dressing rooms have since been converted into offices and subsequently Learning Support rooms. In the mid 1980s, the (in)famous, and now demolished, old ‘Mary Ward’ prefabricated classrooms were added, while in 1996 a new wing of classrooms, including a Science laboratory (now room 302) and a Music room, were constructed.  In the mid 2000s our current Gymnasium and all-weather Hockey pitch were completed, greatly enhancing Loreto's sporting facilities. In the Summer of 2011, construction began on a major extension and refurbishment programme which opened up the school to the Granges Road, providing another dramatic enhancement of our facilities while creating a new identity for the school. Due to complications created by the need to appoint a new contractor, the project was delayed and was not completed until the Autumn of 2013. This new ‘Mary Ward Building’ was officially opened by Noelle Corscadden, IBVM (then Provincial Leader) and blessed by Bishop Seamus Freeman in May of 2014. In 2018 Loreto's Special Needs Unit, Ionad Saoirse, was opened along with a new multi-purpose space, the Hughes Hall (named after the first Mother Superior of the Convent).

Loreto Tradition in Education
The unique characteristic spirit of a Loreto school derives from the vision and spirituality of Mary Ward who founded the Loreto Order over 400 years ago. She wished to pioneer a new role for women in the church and society. At a time when the education of girls was not considered important, Mary Ward set about founding schools for girls. She saw this as the most important means of realising her vision that: ‘women, in time to come, will do much’. Since then, and through centuries of committed service by countless Loreto Sisters, the order has specialised in the provision of education and is renowned worldwide for innovation in their field of expertise.  This vision has been carried on by generations of lay staff members.

Our students can avail of many opportunities to connect with other Loreto students across the country by attending Loreto Sports competitions, debates, Student Council and Development Education conferences. The Loreto identity is strong and as is often said: ‘once a Loreto girl, always a Loreto girl’!

Mary Ward Award
The Mary Ward Award was introduced in 1992 (replacing the student of the year award).  Each year, the Sixth (final) Year students select the student they believe best lives out the Mary Ward values of freedom, justice, truth, sincerity and joy.  The award is presented at the end-of-year prize-giving ceremony.

Alumnae Awards
Each year, at the Christmas awards ceremony, a past pupil is inducted into the Loreto Alumnae roll of honour.  This award was first presented in 2019 (as part of the sesquicentenary celebrations) .  The purpose of the award is to acknowledge the achievements and contributions to society made by Loreto's past pupils and to provide its current students with role models who can inspire them to live out Mary Ward’s prophesy that ‘women in time to come will do much’.

Facilities
At Loreto, it is believed that students and staff should have the best possible facilities to support learning and teaching. Since moving to its current location on the Granges Road in 1980, Loreto has continued to expand and improve in that regard. The school has an impressive range of teaching spaces and specialist rooms facilitating the needs of the curriculum, while student recreational and lunch spaces are also impressive.
Since the ‘new’ school building opened in 1980, the Loreto community has been constantly exploring and delivering ways to improve its facilities. Of these our most significant developments have been:

External links

References

1868 establishments in Ireland
Educational institutions established in 1868
Girls' schools in the Republic of Ireland
Catholic secondary schools in the Republic of Ireland
Sisters of Loreto schools
Secondary schools in County Kilkenny